Lillian is an unincorporated community in Custer County, Nebraska, United States.

History
Lillian was named for Lillian Gohean, daughter of the postmaster. The Lillian post office opened in 1883, closed in 1902, reopened in 1907, and closed permanently in 1934.

References

Populated places in Custer County, Nebraska
Unincorporated communities in Nebraska